Kardeşler is a village in the Bingöl District, Bingöl Province, Turkey. The village had a population of 574 in 2021.

References 

Villages in Bingöl District
Kurdish settlements in Bingöl Province